Berezovets is a rural locality (a selo) in Komarichsky District, Bryansk Oblast, Russia. The population was 22 as of 2010. There is 1 street.

Geography 
Berezovets is located 20 km south of Komarichi (the district's administrative centre) by road. Yupiter is the nearest rural locality.

References 

Rural localities in Komarichsky District